John Diederik Durr (13 September 1930 – 11 March 2010) was a South African swimmer. He competed in two events at the 1952 Summer Olympics.

References

1930 births
2010 deaths
South African male swimmers
Olympic swimmers of South Africa
Swimmers at the 1952 Summer Olympics
Place of birth missing